The George and Neva Barbee House, also known as the Dr. G. S. Barbee House, is a historic home located at Zebulon, Wake County, North Carolina, a town near Raleigh, NC. Constructed in 1914, the two-story, brick American Foursquare house was designed in the American Craftsman / Bungalow style. It features a hipped roof with overhanging eaves, a porte cochere, a sheltered wraparound porch, and a nearly solid brick porch balustrade.

It was listed on the National Register of Historic Places in 2007.

See also
 List of Registered Historic Places in North Carolina

References

Houses on the National Register of Historic Places in North Carolina
American Craftsman architecture in North Carolina
Bungalow architecture in North Carolina
Houses completed in 1914
Houses in Wake County, North Carolina
National Register of Historic Places in Wake County, North Carolina